Comfort (or being comfortable) is a sense of physical or psychological ease, often characterized as a lack of hardship. Persons who are lacking in comfort are uncomfortable, or experiencing discomfort. A degree of psychological comfort can be achieved by recreating experiences that are associated with pleasant memories, such as engaging in familiar activities, maintaining the presence of familiar objects, and consumption of comfort foods. Comfort is a particular concern in health care, as providing comfort to the sick and injured is one goal of healthcare, and can facilitate recovery. Persons who are surrounded with things that provide psychological comfort may be described as being "in their comfort zone". Because of the personal nature of positive associations, psychological comfort is highly subjective.

The use of "comfort" as a verb generally implies that the subject is in a state of pain, suffering or affliction, and requires alleviation from that state. Where the term is used to describe the support given to someone who has experienced a tragedy, the word is synonymous with consolation or solace. However, comfort is used much more broadly, as one can provide physical comfort to someone who is not in a position to be uncomfortable. For example, a person might sit in a chair without discomfort, but still find the addition of a pillow to the chair to increase their feeling of comfort. Something that provides this type of comfort, which does not seek to relieve hardship, can also be referred to as being "comfy".

Concepts

There are various psychological studies about the feeling of comfort, and they have resulted in a few conclusions. The idea of comfort varies among each person; however, there are a few universal themes of comfort that apply to everyone. Most of these universal themes falls under the physical comfort such as contact comfort, comfort food, and thermal comfort.

Contact comfort 
Contact comfort is satisfaction with someone's touch, like a mother's embrace. This is essential to a child's development.

Harry Harlow study 

One of the most famous developmental psychological studies is Harry Harlow's development experiment with monkeys. He separated baby monkeys at birth and raised them with surrogate mothers. There were two types of surrogate mothers: a metal wire one, and one covered with cloth. Each was equipped with a nozzle from which the baby monkeys could "breast" feed. The surrogate mother covered in cloth represented comfort. At the end of the experiment, the psychologist saw that the monkeys would choose the cloth surrogate over the wire surrogate. They concluded that having basic needs is essential, but there is the need of closeness and affection.

This experiment justified that importance of comfort and warmth for child development. All the monkeys that grew up from the experiment expressed a behavior of aggression and atypical sexual behaviors.

Comfort food 
Comfort foods are foods intentionally consumed to move the eater into a pleasurable state. This could be credited to food preferences and childhood experiences (like a mother's cooking).

Physiological responses 
Comfort food is usually chosen because of previous experiences of happiness linked with it. For example, chocolate is held as a popular comfort food as it is follows the pleasurable sweetness and the positive association with gifts/rewards.

The time of day also play a role in consuming comfort foods. Most people tend to eat simply because "it's lunch time" and only 20% of the time is due to actual hunger.

Food preferences 
Food preferences splits into two categories, snack-related and meal-related. If a child was exposed to many snacks growing up, he/she would focus on more snack-related comfort foods later on in life.

Food preference ranges through male/female, and younger/older. Females and the young demographic prefer snack-related comfort foods, while the male and older demographic prefer meal-related comfort foods.

Thermal comfort 

Thermal comfort is a satisfaction of the ambient air temperature and humidity. Psychologists devised a study to determine the most comfortable temperature. The study had people answering a survey as the temperature changed around them. From the surveys, psychologist found many people had no opinion of a range of temperature. This was labeled temperature neutrality, which is the rate as the person metabolism is shifting the same rate as the surrounding temperature. The average comfortable temperature is 30 degrees Celsius. Temperatures too hot (35 °C and above) and temperatures too low (12 °C and below) are considered uncomfortable to many people.

Thermal neutrality 
Thermal Neutrality (Thermal Neutral Zone) is the temperature range where it is neither comfortable or uncomfortable. The human body's metabolism is burning calories at the same rate as the temperature around. This would be around 24 °C (room temperature), and people have no opinion about the temperature. Thermal Neutrality is often also used in animal raising. For example, farmers maintain the neutral temperature for cattle to prevent cold stress.

Everyday uses 
 Floor Surface Temperature - too hot or too cold floors cause discomfort, people wear light shoes or have heated floors.
 Ventilation - no proper air flow throughout a room causes the room to be too hot, windows, fans allow a man-made air current, and air conditioning helps with the heat.

Clothing comfort 
Comfort is related to various perceptions, physiological, social, and psychological needs, and after food, clothing is one of the significant objects that suffices for comfort requirements. Clothing provides aesthetic, tactile, thermal, moisture, and pressure comfort.

 Aesthetic comfort: Visual perception is influenced by color, fabric construction, style, garment fit, fashion compatibility, and finish of clothing material. Aesthetic comfort is necessary for psychological and social comfort.
 Thermoregulation in humans and thermophysiological comfort: Thermophysiological comfort is the capacity of the clothing material that makes the balance of moisture and heat between the body and the environment. It is a property of textile materials that creates ease by maintaining moisture and thermal levels in a human's resting and active states. The selection of textile material significantly affects the comfort of the wearer. Different textile fibers have unique properties that make them suitable for use in various environments. Natural fibers are breathable and absorb moisture, and synthetic fibers are hydrophobic; they repel moisture and do not allow air to pass. Different environments demand a diverse selection of clothing materials. Hence, the appropriate choice is important. The major determinants that influence thermophysiological comfort are permeable construction, heat, and moisture transfer rate.
 Thermal comfort: One primary criterion for our physiological needs is thermal comfort. The heat dissipation effectiveness of clothing gives the wearer a "neither too cold nor too hot" feel. Around , the human body is at ease. Clothing maintains a thermal balance; it keeps the skin dry and cool. It helps to keep the body from overheating while avoiding heat from the environment.
 Moisture comfort: Moisture comfort is the prevention of a damp sensation. According to Hollies' research, it feels uncomfortable when more than 50%–65% of the body's surface is wet.
 Tactile comfort: Tactile comfort is a resistance to the discomfort related to the friction created by clothing against the body. It is related to the smoothness, roughness, softness, and stiffness of the fabric used in clothing. The degree of tactile discomfort may vary between individuals. It is possible due to various factors, including allergies, tickling, prickling, skin abrasion, coolness, and the fabric's weight, structure, and thickness. There are specific surface finishes (mechanical and chemical) that can enhance tactile comfort. Fleece sweatshirts and velvet clothing, for example. Soft, clingy, stiff, heavy, light, hard, sticky, scratchy, prickly are all terms used to describe tactile sensations.
 Pressure comfort: The comfort of the human body's pressure receptors' (present in the skin) sensory response towards clothing. Fabric with lycra feels more comfortable because of this response and superior pressure comfort. The sensation response is influenced by the material's structure: snugging, looseness, heavy, light, soft, or stiff structuring.

See also
Comfort noise, artificial background noise used in radio and wireless communications to fill the silent time in a transmission
Comfort object, an object used to provide psychological comfort
Comfort women, a euphemism for women who were forced to work as sex slaves in Japanese-occupied countries during World War II
Comfort zone, the term used to denote a type of mental conditioning resulting in artificially created mental boundaries, within which an individual derives a sense of security
Consolation
Contentment
Pleasure
Katharine Kolcaba, The Theory of Comfort, a mid-range nursing theory

References

External links

Emotions